John Philip Simpson (1782–1847) was a British painter, known for his portraits.

Early life and education
Simpson was born in London in 1782 and was a student at the Royal Academy and for some years an assistant to Sir Thomas Lawrence, PRA. He obtained some success as a portrait-painter, and eventually a very large practice. From 1807 to his death he was a frequent exhibitor at the Royal Academy and other exhibitions. In 1834 he received a commission to go to Portugal, and painted portraits at Lisbon, where he was appointed painter to the queen of Portugal.

Career
Late 19th-century biographer Sidney Lee was of the opinion that Simpson was "rather a skillful portraitist than an artist and that his portraits are not without power, but lack instinct and penetration." One of John Burnet, the engraver, is in the National Portrait Gallery. William IV and many notable persons in his day sat to him. Simpson died at Carlisle House, Soho, in 1847. 

Simpson left two sons, who practised as artists, of whom Charles Simpson died young in 1848, having contributed a few landscapes to the London exhibitions. The other, Philip Simpson, was a student at the Royal Academy, and obtained some success for small domestic subjects from 1824 to 1857. One of these, called ‘I will fight,’ exhibited in the Suffolk Street Gallery in 1824, is in the Townshend collection at the South Kensington Museum.

Legacy
Simpson's painting The Captive Slave was acquired by the Art Institute of Chicago in 2008 — it had not been displayed to the public for 180 years. Reviewer Martin Postle concludes:

References

 

1782 births
1847 deaths
English portrait painters
19th-century English painters
English male painters
Painters from London
19th-century English male artists